The WEPF World Eightball Pool Championship is a pool world championship organised by the World Eightball Pool Federation using World Rules.  The competition has taken place annually since 1993.

The most successful player in the men's singles is the English player Mick Hill, who won the World Champion title six times and has been runner-up twice. His compatriot Gareth Potts has been World Champion three times and runner-up once.

In the Ladies competition, Scotland's Sue Thompson is the most successful player with eleven titles. Linda Leadbitter from England has won four times, while Emma Cunningham from Northern Ireland and Amy Beauchamp from England have both won the event on three occasions.

History

Men's

Ranking

Women's 
Source WEPF Roll of Honour

Ranking

Junior

Ranking

U-23 Juniors 
(until 2014 U-21 juniors)

Ranking

Senior's

Ranking

Wheelchair

Ranking

External links

References 

World championships in pool
Annual sporting events